The 2018 Evian Championship was played 13–16 September at the Evian Resort Golf Club in Évian-les-Bains, France. It was the 25th Evian Championship (the first 20 played as the Evian Masters), and the sixth as a major championship on the LPGA Tour. The event was televised by Golf Channel and NBC Sports in the United States and Sky Sports in the United Kingdom.

At the age of 40, Angela Stanford won her first major championship on her 76th appearance in a major. Four players tied for second place, a stroke behind, including Amy Olson who came to the last hole needing a par to win but made a double-bogey.

Field
The field for the tournament is set at 120, and most earn exemptions based on past performance on the Ladies European Tour, the LPGA Tour, or with a high ranking in the Women's World Golf Rankings.

There are 15 exemption categories for the 2018 Evian Championship.

1. Evian invitations (four)

Natalie Gulbis, Rachel Heck (a), Alana Uriell (a), Albane Valenzuela (a)

María Fassi (a) and Dylan Kim (a) declined invitations.

2. Top two from the Jabra Ladies Open

Karolin Lampert, Astrid Vayson de Pradenne (10)

3. Winner of the SGF 67 Evian Asia Challenge (South Korea)

Ryu Hae-ran (a)

4. Top two players from the PHC Classic on the Symetra Tour

Lauren Coughlin

Dottie Ardina did not play.

5. The top 40 in the Women's World Golf Rankings, as of 14 August 2018

Marina Alex (9), Brittany Altomare (12), Chun In-gee (6,8), Carlota Ciganda, Austin Ernst, Shanshan Feng (9,12), Georgia Hall (8,9,10,11,12), Nasa Hataoka (9), Brooke Henderson (8,9), Charley Hull, Ji Eun-hee (9), Ariya Jutanugarn (8,9,10), Moriya Jutanugarn (9,12), Danielle Kang (8), Cristie Kerr (9,10), Kim Hyo-joo (6,8), Kim Sei-young (9,12), Ko Jin-young (9), Lydia Ko (6,8,9,12), Jessica Korda (9), Nelly Korda, Lee Jeong-eun, Minjee Lee (9,10), Brittany Lincicome (8,9), Pernilla Lindberg (8,9), Anna Nordqvist (6,8,12), Inbee Park (7,8,9), Park Sung-hyun (8,9), Ryu So-yeon (8,9), Lizette Salas, Lexi Thompson (8), Amy Yang

Choi Hye-jin, In-Kyung Kim (8,12), Stacy Lewis, Teresa Lu, Oh Ji-hyun, Jiyai Shin (10), Ai Suzuki, and Michelle Wie (8,9) did not play.

6. Past Evian Championship winners

Suzann Pettersen did not play.

7. Active Evian Masters Champions (must have played in 10 LPGA Tour or LET events from 4 September 2017 to 4 September 2018)

Paula Creamer, Laura Davies

Juli Inkster did not play.

8. Winners of the other women's majors for the last five years
Brittany Lang, Mo Martin

9. LPGA Tour winners since the 2017 Evian

Annie Park, Thidapa Suwannapura

10. LET winners since the 2017 Evian

Aditi Ashok, Céline Boutier, Ashleigh Buhai, Camille Chevalier, Caroline Hedwall, Meghan MacLaren, Azahara Muñoz, Kanyalak Preedasuttijit, Angel Yin

Jenny Haglund (11) did not play.

11. The top five on the LET Order of Merit, as of 4 September

Sarah Kemp, Klára Spilková, Anne Van Dam

12. Top 10 and ties from the 2017 Evian Championship

Katherine Kirk, Lee Mi-hyang, Jennifer Song, Ayako Uehara

13. 2018 U.S. Women's Amateur champion

Kristen Gillman did not play.

14. 2018 British Ladies Amateur champion

Leonie Harm did not play.

15. LPGA Tour money list, as of 4 September (if needed to fill the field to 120)

Nicole Broch Larsen, Sandra Changkija, Pei-Yun Chien, Chella Choi, Cydney Clanton, Jacqui Concolino, Daniela Darquea, Brianna Do, Lindy Duncan, Jodi Ewart Shadoff, Sandra Gal, Hannah Green, Jaye Marie Green, Mina Harigae, Céline Herbin, Daniela Holmqvist, Wei-Ling Hsu, M. J. Hur, Caroline Inglis, Tiffany Joh, Haeji Kang, Megan Khang, Christina Kim, Bronte Law, Lee Jeong-eun, Mirim Lee, Yu Liu, Gaby López, Nanna Koerstz Madsen, Brittany Marchand, Caroline Masson, Catriona Matthew, Ally McDonald, Wichanee Meechai, Benyapa Niphatsophon, Su-Hyun Oh, Amy Olson, Ryann O'Toole, Lee-Anne Pace, Park Hee-young, Jane Park, Pornanong Phatlum, Morgan Pressel, Beatriz Recari, Robynn Ree, Madelene Sagström, Sherman Santiwiwatthanaphong, Alena Sharp, Jenny Shin, Sarah Jane Smith, Mariah Stackhouse, Angela Stanford, Emma Talley, Kris Tamulis, Pannarat Thanapolboonyaras, Maria Torres, Mariajo Uribe, Sakura Yokomine

Laetitia Beck and Yoo Sun-young did not play.

Nationalities in the field

Past champions in the field

Made the cut

Course

Source:

Round summaries

First round
Thursday, 13 September 2018

Carlota Ciganda and Maria Torres shot 6-under-par rounds of 65 to lead by one stroke over Austin Ernst. The defending champion, Anna Nordqvist, shot 71.

Second round
Friday, 14 September 2018

First round co-leader Maria Torres shot a 69 to remain in a first-place tie with Lee Mi-hyang, Mo Martin, and Amy Olson at 134 (−8). The other first round co-leader, Carlota Ciganda, dropped to 5th place at 135. Defending champion Anna Nordqvist was tied for 30th at 141. World number 1 Park Sung-hyun missed the cut by three strokes with a 148.

Third round
Saturday, 15 September 2018

Amy Olson shot a second straight 65 to take a two-stroke lead over Kim Sei-young.

Final round
Sunday, 16 September 2018

Scorecard
Final round

Cumulative tournament scores, relative to par
{|class="wikitable" span = 50 style="font-size:85%;
|-
|style="background: Red;" width=10|
|Eagle
|style="background: Pink;" width=10|
|Birdie
|style="background: PaleGreen;" width=10|
|Bogey
|style="background: Green;" width=10|
|Double bogey
|}

References

External links

Coverage on the Ladies European Tour's official site 
Coverage on the LPGA Tour's official site

The Evian Championship
Golf tournaments in France
Evian Championship
Evian Championship
Evian Championship